Holy Diver – Live is a live album by American heavy metal band Dio, recorded on tour in 2005. On disc 1, the band performs Holy Diver in its entirety, while disc 2 contains live versions of other songs from Dio's back catalog. It was released in, CD, DVD and Blu-ray formats.

CD track listing

Charts

DVD track listing
"Tarot Woman"
"The Sign of The Southern Cross"
"One Night in the City"
"Stand up and Shout"
"Holy Diver"
"Gypsy"
"Caught in the Middle"
"Don't Talk to Strangers"
"Straight Through the Heart"
"Invisible"
"Rainbow in the Dark"
"Shame on the Night"
"Gates of Babylon"
"Heaven and Hell"
"Man on the Silver Mountain"
"Long Live Rock and Roll"
"We Rock"

Certifications

Band
Ronnie James Dio – vocals
Doug Aldrich – guitar
Rudy Sarzo – bass
Simon Wright – drums
Scott Warren – keyboards

References

Dio (band) albums
2006 live albums
2006 video albums
Live video albums
Eagle Records live albums
Eagle Records video albums